Tonya Knight (March 24, 1966 – February 7, 2023) was an American professional female bodybuilder.

Early life
Tonya Knight was born in 1966 in Peculiar, Missouri.

Bodybuilding career

Professional
Knight finished fourth in the 1988 Ms. Olympia, but she later admitted sending a surrogate to take a mandatory drug test administered before the event after IFBB officials presented strong evidence. In a ruling handed down in November 1989, she was suspended, stripped of her 1989 Ms. International title (which went to runner-up Jackie Paisley) and asked to return her 1989 Ms. International and 1988 Ms. Olympia prize money, totaling $12,000. After the scandal, she returned to the stage in 1991, winning the Ms. International title, this time without incident. She went on to compete in only two more pro contests, the last in 1993.

Legacy
Knight remains the only Ms. International winner to lose one of her titles. She was inducted into the 2011 IFBB Hall of Fame.

Contest history 
1984 NPC USA Championship - 11th (LHW)
1985 NPC USA Championship - 6th (HW)
1986 NPC USA Championship - 4th (HW)
1988 Pro World Championship - 5th
1988 IFBB Ms. Olympia - 4th (later disqualified)
1989 Ms. International - 1st (later disqualified)
1991 IFBB Grand Prix Italy - 1st
1991 Ms. International - 1st
1992 Ms. International - 6th
1993 Jan Tana Classic - 3rd

Personal life and death
Knight lived in Overland Park, Kansas. She was married to the late bodybuilder John Poteat, but they divorced. She had three brothers Timothy, Todd, and Travis, and several step- and in-law siblings, as well as a son named Malachi.

Knight died from cancer on February 7, 2023, at age 56.

Television appearance
From 1989 to 1992, Knight was a regular on American Gladiators as the character Gold, until she left due to an injury to her left knee.

References

| colspan = 3 align = center | Ms. International
|-
| width = 30% align = center | Preceded by:Laura Creavalle
| width = 40% align = center | First (1991)
| width = 30% align = center | Succeeded by:Anja Schreiner

1966 births
2023 deaths
People from Peculiar, Missouri
Actresses from Kansas
Actresses from Missouri
Actresses from Oregon
American female bodybuilders
People from Jackson County, Oregon
Sportspeople from Overland Park, Kansas
Professional bodybuilders
Sportspeople from Ashland, Oregon
Sportspeople from Missouri
21st-century American women